Elsie Rosaline Masson (1890–1935) was an Australian photographer, writer and traveller, best known as the wife of Polish-British anthropologist Bronisław Malinowski. She published An Untamed Territory: The Northern Territory of Australia in 1915.

She was the daughter  of David Orme Masson. She and Malinowski had three daughters, Józefa, Wanda and Helena. Their daughter Helena Malinowska Wayne would conduct research and publish several works about the life her parents, including a book The story of a marriage: the letters of Bronislaw Malinowski and Elsie Masson.

References 

1890 births
1935 deaths
Bronisław Malinowski
Australian writers